Merzbox is a box set compilation by the Japanese noise musician Merzbow. It consists of 50 CDs spanning Merzbow's career from 1979 to 1997. 30 discs are taken from long out of print releases, while 20 are composed mainly of unreleased material. The box also contains two CD-ROMs, six CD-sized round cards, six round stickers, a poster, a black long-sleeve T-shirt, a medallion, and the Merzbook, all packaged together in a "fetish" black rubber box. It is limited to 1000 numbered copies. A Merzbox Sampler was released in 1997.

The Merzbook, subtitled The Pleasuredome of Noise, is a 132-page hardcover book written by Brett Woodward with over 100 images. It contains an extensive biography, culled from previous interviews and articles, a new interview, and essays by Achim Wollscheid, Jim O'Rourke, Damion Romero, Eugene Thacker, and Jonathan Walker. Masami Akita provides extensive liner notes for each disc. The book was also released separately with the Merzrom included.

The Merzrom is an interactive multimedia CD-ROM, designed by Troy Innocent. A second CD-ROM contains various Extreme press and a catalog. The "Merzdallion" medallion was designed by Marcus Davidson. Art direction and design were by Doriana Corda. Audio mastering was by François Tétaz.

History
Extreme's original plan was to reissue Collaborative, their only vinyl release, for the label's tenth anniversary. There was then discussion of reissuing other early releases, with talk of a ten disc box, the number was finally set at 50 discs. The Merzbox was originally scheduled for release in late 1997, and available for pre-order, but kept getting delayed until it was finally released in 2000. It was officially launched on June 16, 2000 at Sónar, Barcelona, where Merzbow also performed.

Those who had pre-ordered received a two CD album called Decomposition with remixes of Eugene Thacker and Shane Fahey followed by the original tracks, the Merzbox Sampler, and two posters. These were then made available with purchase of the Merzbox for extra money.

The Merzbox was exhibited at Kunsthalle Wien, Vienna from April 4 to April 7, 2002. Merzbow performed opening and closing concerts. All 60 hours were webcast live.

In December 2002, Georgia Tech's student-run radio station WREK broadcast the entire 50-disc Merzbox without interruption. An article in Creative Loafing described the Merzbow Marathon as "what may be the most obscure and counterintuitive move in the history of radio."

Between the final recordings of the set and its release, Merzbow switched to using a laptop, having first acquired a Macintosh to work on the artwork for the set.

Masami Akita has stated in a 2009 interview that he has enough unreleased material for another 50 CD box. Between 2010 and 2013, he released four 10 box sets of unreleased raw material recorded from 1987 to 1997; Merzbient, Merzphysics, Merzmorphosis, and Duo. 2012 also saw the release of Lowest Music & Arts 1980–1983, a 10 LP box set that included some full-length albums only partially released in the Merzbox.  Since 2018, further archival recordings have been released through Japanese label Slowdown Records, including the 60 CD boxset 10×6=60 in 2021.

Album listing

OM Electrique

The first noise recordings of Merzbow. Previously unreleased.

Personnel 
Masami Akita – tape recorder, percussion, meditation, guitar, Merztronics, taped drums, voice, water

Metal Acoustic Music

Earliest Merzbow recording available until the release of the Merzbox.

Notes 
Side one of the Metal Acoustic Music cassette, Lowest Music & Arts, 1981

Personnel 
Masami Akita – Merztronics, tape recorder, recorded percussion

Remblandt Assemblage

First work using tape manipulation. Only a few copies distributed.

Notes
Mixed at Lowest Music & Arts, 1980
All tracks from Remblandt Assemblage cassette, Lowest Music & Arts, 1981

Personnel
Masami Akita – tapes, prepared acoustic guitar, noise, tabla, percussion, microphone, voice, radio, concret sounds, egg cutter

Collection Era Vol. 1

The three Collection Era discs are compiled from the ten volume Collection series. The first five volumes were recorded for Ylem and consist of studio sessions with Kiyoshi Mizutani. However, Ylem went out of business before they could be released. Masami Akita then released them himself and recorded five more at home using previous Collection session recordings mixed with new material and effects.

Notes
Mixed at Ylem/Gap Works, Tokyo, 3 June 1981
Tracks 1–2 from Collection 001 cassette, Lowest Music & Arts, 1981
Track 3 from Collection 002 cassette, Lowest Music & Arts, 1981

Personnel
Masami Akita – tapes, ring modulator, violin, tabla, voice, guitar, percussion, drums, radio
Kiyoshi Mizutani – drums on track 1, percussion on track 2, organ on track 3

Collection Era Vol. 2
Note: The contents of CD 5 and CD 6 were switched (5 has eight tracks and 6 has seven), the info below is as it appears in the Merzbook.

Notes
Mixed at Lowest Music & Arts, 1981
Tracks 1–4 from Collection 007 cassette, Lowest Music & Arts, 1981
Track 5 from Collection 009 cassette, Lowest Music & Arts, 1981
Tracks 6–7 from Collection 010 cassette, Lowest Music & Arts, 1982
Merztronics tape used on tracks 6–7

Personnel
Masami Akita – taped drums, tabla, guitar, tapes, Synare 3, percussion, ring modulated recorders, voice, endless tape, noise, rhythm box
Kiyoshi Mizutani – wood bass on track 6

Collection Era Vol. 3

Notes
Tracks 1–7 from Collection 008 cassette, Lowest Music & Arts, 1981
Track 8 from Tridal Production cassette, Lowest Music & Arts, 1982

Personnel
Masami Akita – guitar, tape, damaged tape recorder, bass guitar, Dr. Rhythm, ring modulator, percussion, rubber guitar, violin, tape loops, Synare 3, tabla, drums, synthesizer
Kiyoshi Mizutani – guitar on track 1, piano on track 4, violin on tracks 7–8

Paradoxa Paradoxa

The first Merzbow live performance.

Notes
Mastered from original live recording
Track 1 from Paradoxa Paradoxa cassette, Lowest Music & Arts, 1982
Track 2 previously unreleased

Personnel
Masami Akita – Merztronix, tape, solar organ on track 2, violin, Dr. Rhythm, alto saxophone, radio, feedback
Kiyoshi Mizutani – solar organ on track 1, violin, tape, piano
Masahiro Kurose – live recording

Material Action for 2 Microphones

"Material Action" was a term for using household objects to make quiet sounds, which were then amplified, inspired by John Cage's "Cartridge Music". The term itself was taken from Otto Muehl. This recording was used as raw material for other works such as Material Action 2 N.A.M.

Notes
Mixed at Lowest Music & Arts Studio, 1981
Tracks 1–2 from Material Action for 2 Microphones cassette, Lowest Music & Arts, 1981

Personnel
Masami Akita – condenser microphone, environmental percussion, scratched sound, tapes, turntable, radio
Kiyoshi Mizutani – condenser microphone, percussion, additional synthesizer

Yantra Material Action

Originally intended to be the first Merzbow LP, but it went unreleased. Six months later the label then asked again to release the LP, but Akita decided to record new material – which became Material Action 2 N.A.M. Includes reworks of past recordings with added effects and new instrumentation. The liner notes were to have been written by Fred Frith, who heard the tape and liked it.

Notes
Mixed at Junktion Music Works, 1981
All tracks from Yantra Material Action cassette, Lowest Music & Arts, 1983

Personnel
Masami Akita – tapes, junks, noise, percussion, radio, drums, guitar
Kiyoshi Mizutani – percussion, guitar, keyboards, synthesizer, tapes
H. Kawagishi – sound engineering

Solonoise

Solonoise means "Solar-Noise", inspired by Georges Bataille's The Solar Anus.

Notes
Tracks 1–2 from Solonoise 1 cassette, Lowest Music & Arts, 1982
Track 3 from Solonoise 2 cassette, Lowest Music & Arts, 1982

Personnel
Masami Akita – electronics, ring modulator, violin, voice, treated tapes, acoustic guitar, Nil Vagina tape loop, treated percussion, Synare 3, TV, styrofoam
Kiyoshi Mizutani – violin, electric piano on track 1

Expanded Music

Conceptual works manipulating various inputs using feedback processed audio mixer. Inspired by Stan Brakhage's scratched films.

Notes
Tracks 1-8 from Expanded Music 2 cassette, Lowest Music & Arts, 1982
Track 9 from Musick from Simulation World cassette, Lowest Music & Arts, 1983

Personnel
Masami Akita – TV test signal, feedback mixer, damaged tape recorder, Dr. Rhythm, tapes, percussion, synthesizer

Nil Vagina Tape Loops

Featuring a four track tape recorder found in the street. A different sound was recorded on each track, and then played back randomly.

Personnel
Masami Akita – Sony 464 tape recorder, Nil Vagina tape loop, treated tapes, percussion, Synare 3, Dr. Rhythm

Notes
Track 1 from Solonoise 2 cassette, Lowest Music & Arts, 1982
Tracks 2–3 from Lowest Music 2 cassette, Lowest Music & Arts, 1982

Material Action 2 N.A.M

The first Merzbow LP. The 2 in the title refers to Yantra Material Action, which was meant to be the first LP. Sounds include styrofoam and a typesetting machine (Kiyoshi Mizutani worked at a typesetting company at the time). Includes raw material from Material Action for 2 Microphones.

Notes
All tracks from Material Action 2 N.A.M. LP, Chaos, 1983

Personnel
Masami Akita – tapes, junk percussion, electro-acoustical noise, organ, tape collage, recording, mixing
Kiyoshi Mizutani – tapes, synthesizer, violin, machine noise
H. Kawagishi – engineering

Mechanization Takes Command

First release on ZSF Produkt. Akita changed the name of his label since he wanted to release other artists. Featuring the Synare 3, which was later destroyed by Bara on stage in the late 90s.

Notes
Mixed at ZSF Produkt Studio, Asagaya March 1983
All tracks from Mechanization Takes Command cassette, ZSF Produkt, 1983

Personnel
Masami Akita – Pearl drum kit, various percussion, tapes, TV, Synare 3, voice, tabla, Dr. Rhythm, ring modulator, guitar, feedback, synthesizer, recorder, scrap metals, devices

Dying Mapa Tapes 1-2

Title inspired by the Nyingmapa school of Tibetan Buddhism. Made with different equipment and instruments than other recordings of the same period. Featuring instruments recorded on tape, then slowed down or played backwards.

Notes
Produced by Lowest Music & Arts, 1982
Tracks 1–4 from Dying Mapa I cassette, Aeon, 1983
Track 5 from Dying Mapa II cassette, Aeon, 1983

Personnel
Masami Akita – tapes, radio, ring modulator, percussion, noise, rhythm box, guitar
Kiyoshi Mizutani – violin, percussion

Dying Mapa Tapes 2-3

Notes
Produced by Lowest Music & Arts, 1982
Track 1 from Dying Mapa II cassette, Aeon, 1983
Tracks 2–3 from Dying Mapa III cassette, Aeon, 1983

Personnel
Masami Akita – tapes, radio, ring modulator, percussion, noise, rhythm, junk electronics, TV, guitar, bass
Kiyoshi Mizutani – violin, percussion

Agni Hotra

Originally intended to be the second Merzbow LP, but it went unreleased. Includes outtakes from Ushi-tra, which is from the same period. Loops were included on Loop Panic Limited.

Notes
Tracks 1–4 from first Agni Hotra master
Track 5 from second Agni Hotra master
Track 6 appeared with different mix on Ushi-tra cassette, Cause & Effect, 1985
Track 7 from Ushi-tra recording session

Personnel
Masami Akita – distorted tape loops, metals, recorder, tapes, tape reel, percussion, shakujo, bells, noise

Pornoise 1kg Vol. 1

In the 80s Masami Akita had a mail art project called Pornoise, in which he made collages using discarded magazines – in particular pornographic magazines – taken from the trash. These were then sent along with his cassettes, the idea being that his art was like cheap mail order pornography. Pornoise/1kg was released as part of these activities; the 1 kg refers to the total weight of the original package. The voice on "Night Noise White" is taken from the "Halt Tape".

Notes
All tracks from Pornoise/1kg cassette box, ZSF Produkt, 1984

Personnel
Masami Akita – distorted Sony 464, feedback mixer, radio, loop tapes, Synare 3, rhythm box, ring modulator, devices
Kiyoshi Mizutani – taped typesetting machine noise and taped synthesizer on tracks 2–4 with distorted process

Pornoise 1kg Vol. 2

Field recordings on "Dynamite Don Don" include street sounds recorded from a moving bicycle, and a house being demolished across from Akita's apartment.

Notes
All tracks from Pornoise/1kg cassette box, ZSF Produkt, 1984

Personnel
Masami Akita – distorted Sony 464, feedback mixer, loop tapes, Synare 3, ring modulator, field recording tapes, devices

Pornoise 1kg Vol. 3

The voice on "UFO vs British Army" is taken from the "Halt Tape". Some other samples are from horror films.

Notes
All tracks from Pornoise/1kg cassette box, ZSF Produkt, 1984

Personnel
Masami Akita – distorted Sony 464, feedback mixer, loop tapes, Synare 3, ring modulator, devices

Pornoise Extra

Additional tracks from the Pornoise 1kg sessions. Original release had different track titles.

Notes
All tracks from Pornoise/Extra cassette, ZSF Produkt, 1985

Personnel
Masami Akita – feedback mixer, radio, loop tapes, Synare 3, rhythm box, ring modulator, distorted Sony 464, devices
Kiyoshi Mizutani – sampled electric piano

Sadomasochismo / Lampinak

Includes unused tracks for Batztoutai with Memorial Gadgets

Notes
Tracks 1–3 from Sadomasochismo cassette, ZSF Produkt, 1985
Tracks 4–6 from The Lampinak cassette, ZSF Produkt, 1985

Personnel
Masami Akita – various metal percussion, chain, loops, noise electronics, Synare 3, tapes

Mortegage / Batztoutai Extra

Original recordings for the Batztoutai with Memorial Gadgets album. Includes samples from François Bayle, Conlon Nancarrow, Ivo Malec, Luc Ferrari.

Notes
Track 1 appeared edited on Batztoutai with Memorial Gadgets LP, RRRecords, 1986
Track 2 previously unreleased
Track 3 appeared in different order on Batztoutai with Memorial Gadgets LP

Personnel
Masami Akita – tapes, voice, electronics, scrap metals, percussion, field recordings

Enclosure / Libido Economy

First of two cassettes made with raw material from Ecobondage, Vratya Southward being the second.

Notes
Tracks 1–3 from Enclosure cassette, ZSF Produkt, 1987
Track 5 from Enkele Gemotiveerde Produktiemedewerkers compilation, Midas Music, 1990
Track 6 from Network 77 compilation, Network 77, 1990

Personnel
Masami Akita – bowed instruments with piano wires, ring modulator, tapes, feedback mixer, effects, percussion, turntable

Vratya Southward

Second cassette made with raw material from Ecobondage. "Electric Red Desart" includes a field recording of the  festival at the Goryō shrine in Kamakura. Masami Akita posted photos of the procession on his blog in 2010.

Notes
Tracks 1–2 from Vratya Southward cassette, ZSF Produkt, 1987
Track 3 previously unreleased

Personnel
Masami Akita – cymbals, various percussion, electronics, paper pipe, tapes, plastic, voice, flute, toy marimba, scratch records, electric violin on tracks 1–2; feedback mixer, piano strings on metal box on track 3

Live in Khabarovsk, CCCP – I'm Proud by Rank of the Workers

First two of three performances. First performance was stopped for being "too wild", so they then played more conventionally. Includes Batztoutai material on backing tape, and Russian radio.

Notes
Recorded live at Jazz-on-Amur '88, Khabarovsk, Russia
Live PA recordings by Russian staff
Remastered from original live recording
Different versions appeared on Live in Khabarovsk, CCCP LP, ZSF Produkt, 1988

Personnel
Masami Akita – electric bowed instruments, tape, radio on track 1; drums, tape on track 2
Kiyoshi Mizutani – piano, low feedback US MP guitar on track 1; piano, guitar on track 2

Storage

Due to issues with sound quality, the recording was edited for the LP release. The full-length recording is released here for the first time. The working title for the album was War Storage, which is now used for the track titles.

Notes
All tracks from Storage LP, ZSF Produkt, 1988

Personnel
Masami Akita – bowed instruments with piano wires, percussion, tapes, effects, guitar
Kiyoshi Mizutani – submitted raw material on track 2

Fission Dialogue

Unreleased tracks from Ecobondage and Storage period.

Personnel
Masami Akita – cymbals, various percussion, electronics, voice, byan, bowed instruments, paper pipe on tracks 1–2; noise electronics, turntable, scrap metals on track 3

Collaborative

Essay by Jonathan Walker from the original LP is reprinted in the Merzbook.

Notes
Track 1 recorded at ZSF Produkt on 8 March 1988
Track 2 produced 1988
Track 3 recorded at ZSF Produkt (live) on 1 May 1988
All tracks from Collaborative LP+7″, Extreme, 1988 [Note: The S.B.O.T.H.I. solo track from the 7″ is not included in the Merzbox]

Personnel
Masami Akita – tapes, metals, scratch, guitar, mixing on track 3
Kiyoshi Mizutani – samples, guitar, balalaika, byan on track 3
Achim Wollscheid – raw materials on track 1, production on track 2

Crocidura Dsi Nezumi

"Unplugged noise" made using household objects; violin sound is violin bow on plastic cassette case or wood, acoustic guitar is a rubber band, Tibetan trumpet is a toilet paper tube, electrical sounds are made with metal. "Environmental drums" are the floor, gas stove, the spring of a table lamp.

Names are taken from the Latin names of the Dsinezumi shrew, Japanese stoat, and Japanese least weasel. Other titles were inspired by Frank Zappa's song "The Return of the Son of Monster Magnet" and Sun Ra's album Strange Strings.

Notes
Tracks 1-2 from Crocidura Dsi Nezumi cassette, ZSF Produkt and Banned Production, 1988
Track 3 previously unreleased

Personnel
Masami Akita – environmental drums, bowed instruments, paper pipe, plastic, woods, flute, insects, effects on tracks 1–2; bowed instruments, motor, noise electronics on track 3

KIR Transformation

From a concert with Achim Wollscheid: first Merzbow played, then Wollscheid played using a recording of Merzbow's set, then Merzbow and Wollscheid played together.

Notes
Edited by Achim Wollscheid, 1997

SCUM Vol. 1

SCUM was project to create new works out of previous Merzbow sessions using cut-ups, effects, and mixing. Name taken from the SCUM Manifesto. The track titles influenced by American post-war art. This was last LP record on ZSF Produkt.

Notes
Order of this CD is same as the original master tapes
Tracks 2–5 previously unreleased
All others from Scissors for Cutting Merzbow LP, ZSF Produkt, 1989

Personnel
Masami Akita – electronics, tapes, bowed instruments, percussion, metal junks, motor, piano wires, noise generator, drums, guitar, radio
Kiyoshi Mizutani – junks, effects on raw materials

SCUM Vol. 2

Notes
Order of this CD is same as the original master tapes
Track 4 previously unreleased
All others from Scissors for Cutting Merzbow LP, ZSF Produkt, 1989

Personnel
Masami Akita – electronics, tapes, bowed instruments, percussion, metal junks, motor, piano wires, noise generator, guitar, electric shaver, radio, effects
Kiyoshi Mizutani – guitar, junks, effects on raw materials

Severances

Includes two covers, "Deaf Forever" by Motörhead and the Jimi Hendrix version of "Wild Thing".

Notes
Drum track of "Rap the Khabarovsk" was recorded live in Russia
All tracks from Severances cassette, Discordia/Concordia, 1989

Personnel
Masami Akita – tapes, turntables, electronix, drum kit, percussion, voice, metal percussion, bowed instruments, electro-shaver, motor, self-made junk
Kiyoshi Mizutani – tape materials: guitar on tracks 1 and 3; keyboard, computer rhythm on track 2

Steel CUM

The EP on Vertical Records was remixed and released without permission, with the cover made using one of Masami Akita's collages. "But a result of EP was fine. So, I'm agreed. But EP is still bootleg."

Notes
Mixed at ZSF Produkt Studio 1989
All tracks from Steel Cum cassette, ZSF Produkt, 1990
Some parts appeared on Steel Cum 7″, Vertical, 1992

Personnel
Masami Akita – guitar, drums, tapes, electronics, metal bowed instruments, feedback mixer, turntable
Kiyoshi Mizutani – drums, guitar on some parts

Cloud Cock OO Grand

During the European tour in 1989, Masami Akita could only bring simple equipment, and created a new live electronics style, different from his acoustical and tape based studio work, leading to the harsh noise Merzbow became known for in the 1990s. Cloud Cock OO Grand was the first example of this style, Merzbow's first digital recording, and the only CD on ZSF Produkt.

Notes
Mixed at ZSF Produkt Studio 17 April 1990
Track 4 includes live recordings at V2, 's-Hertogenbosch, and Diogenes, Nijmegen, September 1989
All tracks from Cloud Cock OO Grand CD, ZSF Produkt, 1990 [Note: "Modular" is about five minutes longer here than on the original CD]

Personnel
Masami Akita – tapes, noise electronics, metals, distorted DBX, turntable, loops, bowed instruments, metal harp, short wave
Reiko Azuma – bowed instruments on track 4
Peter Duimelinks – original live recordings

Newark Hellfire, Live at WFMU, USA

Radio session from Merzbow's first American tour.

Notes
Live recording by WFMU
Remastered from original recording at ZSF Produkt Studio
An excerpt appeared on Great American Nude / Crash for Hi-Fi CD, Alchemy, 1991

Personnel
Masami Akita – feedback audio mixer, metals, electronics, electric shaver
Reiko Azuma – metals, bowed instruments

Hannover Cloud

Features outtakes from Hannover Interruption and Cloud Cock OO Grand. "Rocket Bomber" uses raw materials from Sadomasochismo.

Notes
Tracks 1–2 outtakes from Hannover Interruption LP, Dradomel, 1990
Track 3 outtake from Cloud Cock OO Grand CD, ZSF Produkt, 1990
Track 4 different mix appeared on Cloud Cock OO Grand

Personnel
Masami Akita – noise electronics, metals, tapes

Stacy Q, Hi-Fi Sweet Leaf

Originally made as raw material for "Crash for Hi-Fi", "Wing Over", and "Another Crash for High Tide". Includes the use of a scratched Cloud Cock OO Grand CD.

Notes
All tracks no editing

Personnel
Masami Akita – noise electronics, tapes, scratched CD, radio, sound effect records, guitar

Music for True Romance Vol. 1

Backing tracks made for True Romance, a performance art project with Seido and Bara.

Notes
Tracks 1–4 made for Blood Orgy of the She Dolls soundtrack, 1992
Track 5 made for "Isis and Secret Army Hyper Vivisection" performance at MOMA, Kyoto, 1993

Personnel
Masami Akita – tapes, electronics, disks

Brain Ticket Death

Track 4 samples Brainticket's self-titled song from their album Cottonwoodhill. It's also a reference to Nurse with Wound, who used the same bit on Brained by Falling Masonry.

Personnel
Masami Akita – noise electronics, metals, turntable, bass, guitar

Sons of Slash Noise Metal

Tracks 1 and 3 were made as raw material for recordings of the same period. Track 2 is a remix of a fragment.

Notes
All tracks remastered from original mother tape, no editing

Personnel
Masami Akita – metals, noise electronics, scratched CD, radio, tapes

Exotic Apple

Includes Arthur Lyman samples. Yuuri Sunohara is a director, producer, model etc. for Kinbiken/Right Brain. "Apple Rock" includes unused material originally made for Flying Testicle.

Notes
Track 1 from Melt compilation, Work In Progress, 1992
Track 2 from Land of the Rising Noise compilation, Charnel House, 1993

Personnel
Masami Akita – tapes, noise electronix, metals, guitar, EMS Synthi A, Roland TR-606

Liquid City

Originally intended to be part of a CD+CD-ROM called Scatologic Baroque, but it was canceled. The material for the CD-ROM was use for the book Anal Baroque. Part of the "World Trilogy" with Magnesia Nova and Green Wheels. "Liquid City 17-1-95" was recorded on the same day as the Great Hanshin earthquake. "Tiabguls" is a Throbbing Gristle tribute.

Notes
Track 3 from Entertainment Through Pain compilation, RRRecords, 1995

Personnel
Masami Akita – noise electronics, metals, EMS, voice

Red Magnesia Pink

Outtakes from Red 2 Eyes, Magnesia Nova, and Pinkream.

Personnel
Masami Akita – EMS Synthi 'A', noise electronics, metal, filters, voice

Marfan Syndrome

"Marfan Syndrome for Blue" is Akita's first track to use the EMS synthesiser. Track 2 is a reference to Claes Oldenburg, who creates oversized sculptures of everyday objects, including soft sculptures.

Notes
Track 1 appeared with different mix on Eternal Blue Extreme compilation, Somnus, 1994
Track 4 appeared edited on Coruscanto by Reiko Azuma, Nekoisis, 1995
All others previously unreleased

Personnel
Masami Akita – noise electronics, EMS, Synare 3, metals, rubber bass guitar, telephone signal, tape, voice
Reiko Azuma – voice on tracks 1 and 5

Rhinogradentia

Named after a fictitious order of mammals. Masami Akita performed solo twice as Zecken, playing this style.

Notes
Remixed in 1997

Personnel
Masami Akita – noise electronics, EMS, audio generator, filters

Space Mix Travelling Band

Tracks 1–2 are based on four channel tape: two channels recorded in 1994 and used on tracks of the same period, and two channels of EMS recorded in 1996. Additional EMS and Moog overdub and final mix in 1997.

Notes
Raw materials of tracks recorded during 1994–1996
Track 3 different mix used as raw material for Brisbane–Tokyo Interlace with John Watermann, Cold Spring, 1996

Personnel
Masami Akita – noise electronics, EMS, Moog, metals, voice, tapes

Motorond

Track 1 was the most recent live performance when the Merzbox was compiled.

Notes
All remixed at ZSF Produkt Studio, April 1997
Track 2 last 10 minutes appeared on Non Stop Noise Party, Hond in de Goot, 2000

Personnel
Masami Akita – noise electronics, Novation Bass Station, metals, pressure pedal
Bara – voice

Annihiloscillator

Selection of recent tracks when the Merzbox was compiled. Track 3 is a reference to Marguerite Yourcenar's Dark Brain of Piranesi, an essay about Giovanni Battista Piranesi's Carceri prints.

Notes
Raw material for track 2 recorded live in California, 1995
Track 4 appeared on Merzbow/Kadef split 10″, Dreizehn, 1997

Personnel
Masami Akita – metal, noise electronix, EMS on tracks 1–2, Theremin on tracks 1–4, Moog on track 4
Reiko Azuma – noise on track 2
Bara – voice on track 2

References

Merzbow compilation albums
2000 compilation albums